Let's Get It On is the thirteenth studio album by American soul singer, songwriter, and producer Marvin Gaye. It was released on August 28, 1973, by the Motown subsidiary label Tamla Records on LP.

Recording sessions for the album took place during June 1970 to July 1973 at Hitsville U.S.A. and Golden World Studio in Detroit, and at Hitsville West in Los Angeles. Serving as Gaye's first venture into the funk genre, Let's Get It On also incorporates smooth soul and doo-wop styles alongside sexually suggestive lyrics, leading to one writer's description of it as "one of the most sexually charged albums ever recorded". Gaye infused ideas of spiritual healing in songs about sex and romance, in part as a way of coping with childhood abuses from his father Marvin Gay Sr., which had stunted his sexuality.

Following the breakthrough success of his socially conscious album What's Going On (1971), Let's Get It On helped establish Gaye as a sex icon and broadened his mainstream appeal. It produced three singles—the title track, "Come Get to This", and "You Sure Love to Ball"—that achieved Billboard chart success. Let's Get It On became the most commercially successful album of Gaye's career at Motown, resulting in more creative control being given to him by the label. Its erotic balladry, multi-tracking of Gaye's vocals, and seductive funk sound also influenced later R&B recording artists and producers, with the title track specifically helping pioneer the slow jam and quiet storm formats.

In retrospect, Let's Get It On has been regarded by writers and music critics as a landmark recording in soul. It increased the popularity of funk during the 1970s, while Gaye's smooth-soul sound marked a change from his record label's previous success with the "Motown Sound" formula. Among the most acclaimed LPs in history, it frequently appears on professional rankings of the greatest albums and has been inducted into the Grammy Hall of Fame as a historically important recording. In 2001, it was reissued by Motown as a two-CD deluxe edition release.

Background 
In the spring of 1972, Marvin Gaye was suffering from writer's block. Following the release of his most commercially successful album up to that point, What's Going On (1971), and the soundtrack album to the blaxploitation film Trouble Man (1972), Gaye had struggled to come up with new material after Motown Records had renegotiated a new contract with him. The contract provided him with more creative control over his recordings. The deal was worth $1 million, making him the highest-earning soul artist, as well as the highest-earning black artist, at the time. He was also struggling with deciding whether or not to relocate to Los Angeles, following Motown-CEO Berry Gordy's move of the record label and replacement of the Detroit-based Hitsville U.S.A. (Motown Studio A) recording studio with the Hitsville West studio in Los Angeles. Amid relocation and his lack of material, Gaye was struggling with his conscience, as well as dealing with expectations from his wife, Gordy's sister Anna. Gaye's separation from Gordy pressured him emotionally. During this time, he had also been attempting to cope with past issues that had stemmed from his childhood.

During his childhood, Gaye had been physically abused by his preacher father Marvin Gay, Sr., who disciplined his son under extremely moralistic and fundamentalist Christian teachings. As a result, the meaning and practice of sex had later become a disturbing question for Gaye. As an adult, he suffered from impotence and became plagued by sadomasochistic fantasies, which haunted him in his dreams and provoked intense feelings of guilt. Gaye learned to cope with his personal issues with a newly found spirituality. He began incorporating his new outlook into his music, as initially expressed through the socially conscious album What's Going On, along with promotional photos of him wearing a kufi in honor of African traditional religions and his faith.

By winning over record executives with the success of What's Going On, Gaye attained more creative control, which he would use, following his brief separation from wife Anna Gordy, to record an album that was meant to explore themes beyond sex. As with What's Going On, Gaye wanted to have a deeper meaning than the general theme that was used to portray it; in the case of the former album, politics, and with its follow-up effort, love and romance, which would be used by Gaye as a metaphor for God's love. In his book Divided Soul: The Life of Marvin Gaye, Gaye biographer David Ritz wrote of the singer's inspiration behind Let's Get It On:

In the album's liner notes, Gaye explained his views on the themes of sex and love, stating "I can't see anything wrong with sex between consenting anybodies. I think we make far too much of it. After all, one's genitals are just one important part of the magnificent human body ... I contend that SEX IS SEX and LOVE IS LOVE. When combined, they work well together, if two people are of about the same mind. But they are really two discrete needs and should be treated as such. Time and space will not permit me to expound further, especially in the area of the psyche. I don't believe in overly moralistic philosophies. Have your sex, it can be exciting, if you're lucky. I hope the music that I present here makes you lucky."

Recording 

Gaye proceeded to record some more politically conscious material at the Golden World Records studio, known as Motown's Studio B, as well as the preliminary vocals and instrumentation for some of the material to be featured on Let's Get It On. Following the earlier sessions in Detroit at Golden World, Gaye recorded at Hitsville West in Los Angeles from February to July 1973. Accompanied by an experienced group of session musicians called The Funk Brothers, who had contributed to Gaye's What's Going On, and received their first official credit, Gaye recorded the unreleased songs "The World is Rated X" and "Where Are We Going" and the single "You're the Man" (1972) at Golden World. "Where Are We Going" was later covered by trumpeter Donald Byrd. Gaye had planned the release of an album titled You're the Man, but it was later shelved for unknown reasons. The songs that were to be included on it, along with other unreleased recordings from Hitsville West and Golden World, were later featured on the 2001 re-release of Let's Get It On.

The album's first recording, "Let's Get It On", was composed by Gaye with friend and former Motown label mate Ed Townsend. It was originally written by Gaye as a religious ode to life, but Motown singer-songwriter Kenneth Stover re-wrote it as a more political first draft. Upon hearing Gaye's preliminary mix of Stover's draft, Townsend protested and claimed that the song would be better suited with sexual and romantic overtones, particularly "about making sweet love." Gaye and Townsend rewrote the song's lyrics together with the original arrangements and musical accompaniment of the demo intact. The lyrics were inspired by Janis Hunter, whom Gaye had become infatuated with after meeting each other through Ed Townsend during the initial sessions. Townsend has cited Hunter's presence during the album's recording as an inspiration for Gaye. Gaye's intimate relationship with Hunter subsequently became the basis for his 1976 album I Want You. While recording the title track, he was inspired to revive unfinished recordings from his 1970 sessions at the Hitsville U.S.A. Studio.

Townsend assisted Gaye with producing the rest of the album, whose recording took place at several sessions throughout 1970 to 1973. They worked on four songs together, including the ballad "If I Should Die Tonight", while Gaye composed most of the other songs, including those from past sessions. "Just to Keep You Satisfied" was originally recorded by several Motown groups, including The Originals and The Monitors, as a song dedicated to long-standing love. With re-recording the song, he had re-written the arrangement and lyrics to address the demise of his volatile marriage to Anna Gordy Gaye, who happened to be the original song's co-writer. The background vocals for the album were sung by Gaye, with the exception of "Just to Keep You Satisfied", which were done by The Originals. Most of the instrumentation for the album was done by members of The Funk Brothers, including bassist James Jamerson, guitarists Robert White and Eddie Willis, and percussionist Eddie "Bongo" Brown. Gaye also contributed on piano during the sessions.

Music and lyrics 
 

"Let's Get It On" features soulful, passionate lead vocals and multi-tracked background singing, both by Gaye. It has a 1950s-styled melody and begins with three wah-wah guitar notes and centers on simple chord changes, while its arrangements are centered on an eccentric rhythm pattern. Its signature guitar line is played by session musician Don Peake. Music journalist Jon Landau dubs the song "a classic Motown single, endlessly repeatable and always enjoyable". The song is reprised on the fourth track, "Keep Gettin' It On". It expands on the title track's sensual theme with political overtones: "won't you rather make love, children / as opposed to war, like you know you should."

The third track, the ballad "If I Should Die Tonight" originally appeared on the vinyl LP in a shortened version lasting only 3:03. For the 1986  'twofer' (with "What's Going On") CD reissue of the album, Motown recording engineers for the first time restored the missing verse which had been omitted from the LP. The full length track, which has been used for all subsequent releases, runs to 4 full minutes.

"Distant Lover" has Gaye crooning over serene instrumentation, leading to soulful screams near the end; from a heartbroken croon to an impassioned wail. The song's lyrics chronicled the yearning its narrator feels for a lover who is "so many miles away", as he pleads for her return and laments the emptiness he feels without her. Music writer Donarld A. Guarisco later wrote of the song's sound, in that "Marvin Gaye's studio recording enhances the dreamy style of the song with stately horn and strings, tumbling drum fills that gently nudge the song along, and mellow, doo wop-styled background vocals that echo "love her, you love her" under his romantic pleas. The song later became a concert favorite for Gaye and a live concert version, featuring female fans screaming in the background, was released as a single from his Marvin Gaye Live! album in 1974.

"You Sure Love to Ball" is one of Gaye's most sexually overt and controversial singles, with its intro and outro featuring moaning sounds made by a man and woman engaged in sex. The sexually-explicit and risqué nature of the album's content were, at the time, controversial, and the recording of such an album was deemed as a commercial risk by Motown A&R's (Artists and Repertoire) and label executives.

Marketing and sales 

Released on August 28, 1973, Let's Get It On surpassed Gaye's previous studio effort, What's Going On, as the best-selling record of his tenure with Motown. The album peaked at number two on the US Billboard Top LPs chart, behind The Rolling Stones's Goats Head Soup (1973), while it also managed to reach number one in Cash Box for one week, as well as two weeks at the top of Record Worlds music charts. Let's Get It On charted for 61 weeks on the Billboard charts, and remained at the top of the Billboard Soul Albums for 11 weeks, becoming the best-selling soul album of 1973.

Two of the album's singles reached the top 40 of the Billboard Hot 100, including "Let's Get It On", which became Gaye's second number-one US single, and the top-30 hit "Come Get to This", which peaked at number 23 on the chart. The album's third single, "You Sure Love to Ball", charted at number 50 on the Hot 100 and at number 13 on the Soul Singles chart.

Along with the album's music and sexual content, Let's Get It Ons commercial success and promotion helped establish Marvin Gaye as a sex icon, while helping further expand his artistic control during his tenure at Motown. This commercial success also led to a much publicized tour for Gaye to promote Let's Get It On and expand on his repertoire as a live performer. Successful concert performances of the album's material helped Gaye gain an increasing popularity and fan base in the pop market, while earning him a reputation as one of the top live performers of the time. His performance at the Oakland Coliseum during the 1973-1974 tour was released on the 1974 LP Live!, which would serve as Gaye's only release during his sabbatical period in the mid-1970s.

Critical reception 

Let's Get It On received positive reviews from music critics. Billboard called it "fine in terms of vocal attack and material [...] touches on the excellent in terms of instrumental support", while citing the title track and "Distant Lover" as the album's best recordings. Jon Landau of Rolling Stone found Gaye's performance on-par with that of What's Going On and wrote that "he continues to transmit that same degree of intensity, sending out near cosmic overtones while eloquently phrasing the sometimes simplistic lyrics". Although he viewed that it "lacks that album's series of highpoints", Landau commented that "it ebbs and flows, occasionally threatening to spend itself on an insufficiency of ideas, but always retrieved, just in time, by Gaye's performance. From first note to last, he keeps pushing and shoving, and if he sometimes takes one step back for every two ahead, he gets there just the same — and with style and spirit to spare". In Creem magazine, Robert Christgau called the record "post-Al Green What's Going On, which means it's about fucking rather than the human condition, thank the wholly holey".

Since its initial reception, Let's Get It On has been viewed by writers as a milestone in soul music. In The Best Rock 'n' Roll Records of All Time, Jimmy Guterman writes that the album was "a bit more conventional musically (soul crossing into mild funk) and much more focused lyrically than its predecessor, What's Going On". Chicago Tribune writer Greg Kot commended Gaye for using "the multi-tracked vocals perfected on What's Going On, this time to convey his most intimate desires", commenting that "while the album is replete with erotic imagery, both implied and explicit, it is also as much preoccupied with distance and unfulfilled need". Jason Ankeny of Allmusic called it "a record unparalleled in its sheer sensuality and carnal energy", writing that "Gaye's passions reach their boiling point [...] With each performance laced with innuendo, each lyric a come-on, and each rhythm throbbing with lust, perhaps no other record has ever achieved the kind of sheer erotic force of Let's Get It On". Ankeny also dubbed it "one of the most sexually charged albums ever recorded." Allmusic's Lindsay Planer cites it as a "hedonistic R&B masterpiece." BBC Music's Daryl Easlea found Gaye "in supreme command of his material", and viewed it as "much more than an album about simple lust", but an "iconic, rapturous work".

Accolades 
Much like What's Going On, Let's Get It On has been included in numerous professional lists of the best albums. It was ranked number 58 on The Times's 1993 publication of the 100 Best Albums of All Time. Blender magazine ranked the album number 15 on its list of the 100 Greatest American Albums of All Time. In 2003, it was ranked number 165 on Rolling Stones 500 Greatest Albums of All Time publication; the 2020 edition of the list ranked it 422nd. Also in 2003,  Let's Get It On was reissued by Universal Music; the re-release was later given a silver certification by the British Phonographic Industry. In 2004, Let's Get It On was inducted into the Grammy Hall of Fame and cited by The Recording Academy as a recording of "historical significance". Based on such listings, the aggregate website Acclaimed Music ranks it as the 215th most critically acclaimed album in history, as well as the 70th most from the 1970s and the eighth most from 1973.

Legacy and influence 
Because of the album and its singles' initial sales and response, Let's Get It On marked a change and transition in sound and production for Motown, which had previously enjoyed success with its trademark "Motown Sound". The label's well-known sound, however, was beginning to fade in popularity among the majority of R&B and soul listeners, while experiencing commercial pressure from contemporary styles that incorporated more diverse elements, such as Philly soul and funk. The Motown sound was typified by characteristics such as the use of tambourines to accent the back beat, prominent and often melodic electric bass guitar lines, distinctive melodic and chord structures, and a call and response singing style that originated in gospel music. In addition, pop production techniques were simpler than that of Gaye's 1970s concept albums. Complex arrangements and elaborate, melismatic vocal riffs were avoided by Motown musicians. Following his breakthrough with What's Going On, an "experiment in collating a pseudo-classical suite of free-flowing songs", Gaye used his artistic control to modify the sound and incorporate funky instrumentation, melismatic vocalization, and heavy vocal multi-tracking, in much contrast to the established production style at the label. In contrast to Motown's previously successful process of emphasizing an artist's single releases rather than their album, Gaye and fellow producer Ed Townsend followed a similar formula previously used on What's Going On, in which the album's songs flow together in a suite-form arrangement, opposing label CEO Berry Gordy's strong emphasis on hit single success.

Gaye's change of musical style and production with the album made an immediate impact on the subsequently successful Motown artists, including Lionel Richie and Rick James. The album's vocal multi-tracking and instrumentation also influenced the development of contemporary R&B and slow jams. Allmusic calls the album "the blueprint for all of the slow jams to follow decades later — much copied, but never imitated." Renown engineer Russell Elevado's work in the neo soul genre, including his production for D'Angelo's Voodoo (2000) and Erykah Badu's Mama's Gun (2000), has been influenced by Gaye's and Townsend's production techniques and sound.

The album's sexual content pushed creative barriers in the recording industry and led to an increased popularity of sexual themes in contemporary music. Music writer Rob Bowman later cited Let's Get It On as "one of the most erotic recordings known to mankind." The album's success helped spark a series of similarly styled releases by such smooth soul artists as Barry White (Can't Get Enough), Smokey Robinson (A Quiet Storm) and Earth, Wind & Fire (That's the Way of the World). The commercial success of such artists led to a change of trend from socially conscious aesthetics to more mainstream, sensually themed music. Gaye achieved further success with I Want You (1976), featuring more sexually explicit lyrics and expanded use of vocal multi-tracking, and with Here, My Dear (1978), which he based entirely on his tumultuous marriage to Anna Gordy. In an interview with music author Michael Eric Dyson, hip hop artist Q-Tip discussed the album's influence and significance to its time period, stating:

Following the success of Sly and the Family Stone's There's a Riot Goin' On (1971) and James Brown's late 1960s and early 1970s singles, Gaye's Let's Get It On gave greater mainstream exposure to funk and broadened its influence on the music industry. Many later R&B musicians, such as Prince, D'Angelo, and R. Kelly, were greatly influenced by its vintage sound and seductive themes, incorporating much of Gaye's musical style into their music.

Track listing

Original release

2001 deluxe edition 
On September 18, 2001, Let's Get It On was reissued by Motown as a two-disc deluxe edition release, featuring 24-bit digital remastering of the original album's recordings, previously unissued material and a 24-page booklet which contains the original LP liner notes by Marvin Gaye, as well as essays from Gaye biographers David Ritz and Ben Edmonds.

Personnel 

Orchestral arrangement, Conducting: David Van De Pitte (tracks: 5 to 6, 8), Gene Page (track: 5), René Hall (tracks: 1 to 4), David Blumberg (track: 7)
Bass: James Jamerson, Wilton Felder
Bongos: Bobbye Hall Porter
Bongos, Drums: Eddie "Bongo" Brown
Drums: Paul Humphrey, Uriel Jones
Engineer: William McKeekin, Art Stewart, Steve Smith, Lawrence Miles, Cal Harris
Guitar: David T. Walker, Eddie Willis, Louis Shelton, Melvin Ragin, Robert White, Don Peake
Mallet percussion: Emil Richards
Percussion (Special treatment): Bobbye Hall Porter 
Saxophone: Ernie Watts, Plas Johnson
Piano: Joe Sample, Marvin Gaye, Marvin Jerkins
Photography: Jim Britt, Motown Archives
Production, lead vocals, background vocals: Marvin Gaye, except where noted:
Background vocals: The Originals ("Just to Keep You Satisfied")
Co-production: Ed Townsend (tracks: 1 to 4)
Vibraphone: Emil Richards, Victor Feldman

Charts

Weekly charts

Year-end charts

See also
List of number-one R&B albums of 1973 (U.S.)
Smooth soul

References

Bibliography

External links 
 Let's Get It On at Discogs
 [ Let's Get It On (Deluxe Edition)] at Allmusic

1973 albums
Albums arranged by Gene Page
Albums arranged by René Hall
Albums produced by Marvin Gaye
Grammy Hall of Fame Award recipients
Marvin Gaye albums
Tamla Records albums
Albums recorded at Hitsville U.S.A.